Ramaiah Yogarajan (born 13 June 1950) is a Sri Lankan engineer, politician and former Member of Parliament.

Early life
Yogarajan was born on 13 June 1950.

Career
Yogarajan was a member of the Western Provincial Council from 1993 to 1994. He contested the 1994 parliamentary election as one of the United National Party (UNP)'s candidates in Colombo District but failed to get elected. However, he entered Parliament following the assassination of Ossie Abeygunasekera and Weerasinghe Mallimarachchi in October 1994. He contested the 2000 parliamentary election as one of the UNP's candidates in Colombo District but again failed to get elected. However, in July 2001 People's Alliance National List MP K. Marimuttu resigned to take up a diplomatic position and Yogarajan replaced him in Parliament.

Yogarajan contested the 2001 parliamentary election as one of the United National Front (UNF)'s candidates in Colombo District but again failed to get elected. However, after the election he was appointed National List MP by the UNF. He contested the 2004 parliamentary election as one of the UNF's candidates in Colombo District but failed to get elected after coming twelfth amongst the UNF candidates.

Yogarajan, who was the Ceylon Workers' Congress' national organizer, resigned from the party on 30 December 2009 to support common opposition candidate Sarath Fonseka at the presidential election and joined the UNP. After the 2010 parliamentary election he was appointed National List MP by the UNF.

Yogarajan was one of the United National Front for Good Governance's candidates in Nuwara Eliya District at the 2015 parliamentary election but failed to get re-elected after coming 11th amongst the UNFGG candidates.

Electoral history

References

1950 births
Ceylon Workers' Congress politicians
Living people
Indian Tamil engineers of Sri Lanka
Indian Tamil politicians of Sri Lanka
Members of the 10th Parliament of Sri Lanka
Members of the 11th Parliament of Sri Lanka
Members of the 12th Parliament of Sri Lanka
Members of the 14th Parliament of Sri Lanka
Members of the Western Provincial Council
People from Western Province, Sri Lanka
Sri Lankan Hindus
United National Party politicians